Phase 1, also known as The Phase, was a lesbian bar and nightclub at 525 8th Street, Southeast in Washington, D.C. Located one block south of Pennsylvania Avenue, SE near Eastern Market in the Capitol Hill neighborhood, Phase 1 was the oldest continually operating lesbian bar in the United States and the oldest operating LGBT bar in Washington, D.C. until its closure in February, 2016.

History 
In 1971, Allen Carroll and Chris Jansen founded Phase 1 and would go on to open another LGBT bar in Southeast, Ziegfeld's. Phase 1 was originally located beside Plus One, a gay bar that broke the city’s “no same-sex dancing” code when owners Henry Hecht of the Hecht's department store family, Donn Culver, and Bill Bickford installed a dance floor.

Events 
Phase 1 was a sponsor of Capital Pride, the LGBT pride festival held each year in Washington, D.C. and the fourth largest gay pride event in the United States. Phase 1 also worked with local organizations such as the Whitman-Walker Clinic and D.C. Rape Crisis Center.

In August 2007, musician Mara Levi, Phase 1 manager Angela Lombardi, and Riot Grrl, Ink organized the first Phase Fest. The three-day event hosted at Phase 1 featured local and nationwide musical acts such as God-Des and She, Nicky Click, and others which are geared towards lesbians. The event became the largest queer art and music festival on the East Coast.

See also

 Codman Carriage House and Stable, previous location of Phase 1's second venue
 Halo (bar)
 Velvet Nation

References

1971 establishments in Washington, D.C.
2016 disestablishments in Washington, D.C.
Lesbian culture in Washington, D.C.
Lesbian organizations in the United States
LGBT nightclubs in Washington, D.C.
Women in Washington, D.C.
Defunct LGBT nightclubs in the United States